The 2011 United Football League (known as the LBC United Football League for sponsorship reasons) began with seven teams in Division 1 and eight teams in Division 2. This was the second season of the United Football League since its establishment as a semi-professional tournament in 2009.

The season started on 23 January 2011 with two matches at the University of Makati Stadium. Philippine Air Force F.C. are the current defending Champions.

The Philippine Air Force won their second title in the first division. The Manila Nomads won their first title in the second division and together with Stallion FC and Pasargad, they were promoted to the 2012 United Football League Division 1 after their good stint in the 2011 UFL Cup.

League tables

Division 1

Division 2

Venues

Personnel and Kits

References

External links
 

 
United Football League (Philippines) seasons
1
Phil
Phil